A list of British films released in 1994.

1994

See also
 1994 in film
 1994 in British music
 1994 in British radio
 1994 in British television
 1994 in the United Kingdom
 List of 1994 box office number-one films in the United Kingdom

References

External links

1994
Films
British